Acteonella is a genus of extinct sea snails, marine gastropod mollusks in the extinct family Acteonellidae.

The genus is known from the Cretaceous period.

Species 
Species within the genus Acteonella include:

 Actaeonella borneensis Sohl and Kollmann, 1985
 Actaeonella briggsi Sohl and Kollmann, 1985
 Actaeonella browni Sohl and Kollmann, 1985
 Actaeonella coquiensis Sohl and Kollmann, 1985
 Actaeonella cubensis Sohl and Kollmann, 1985
 Actaeonella delgadoi Choffat, 1901
 Actaeonella jicarensis Sohl and Kollmann, 1985
 Actaeonella lucianoi Maury, 1930
 Actaeonella marchmontensis Sohl and Kollmann, 1985
 Actaeonella oviformis Gabb, 1869
 Actaeonella pecosensis Stanton, 1947
 Actaeonella pompei Maury, 1930
 Actaeonella robinsoni Sohl and Kollmann, 1985
 Actaeonella silvai Maury, 1925
 Actaeonella tamandarensis Maury, 1930

References 

Acteonellidae